Panorama Community School District is a rural public school district headquartered in Panora, Iowa. It operates an elementary school, a middle school, and a high school in Panora.

The district is mostly in Guthrie County but has portions in Dallas and Greene counties. The district serves, in addition to Panora, the towns of Bagley, Jamaica, Linden, Yale, and Lake Panorama.

The district formed on July 1, 1989, as a merger of the Panora-Linden and Y-J-B school districts.

Schools
The district operates three schools, all in Panora:
Panorama Elementary School
Panorama Middle School
Panorama High School

Panorama High School

Athletics
The Panthers compete in the West Central Activities Conference in the following sports:
Cross Country
 Girls' 2017 Class 1A State Runner-up
Volleyball
Football
Basketball
Wrestling
Track and Field
 Boys' 1997 Class 1A State Champions
Golf
 Boys' 2015 Class 2A State Champions
 Boys' 2016 Class 2A State Champions
Baseball
Softball

See also
List of school districts in Iowa
List of high schools in Iowa

Notes

References

External links
 Panorama Community School District
 

School districts in Iowa
Education in Dallas County, Iowa
Education in Greene County, Iowa
Education in Guthrie County, Iowa
School districts established in 1989
1989 establishments in Iowa